Raymond Ducharme Morand,  (January 30, 1887 – February 2, 1952) was a Canadian politician.

Born in Windsor, Ontario, he was first elected to the House of Commons of Canada for the riding of Essex East in the 1925 federal election. A Conservative, he was defeated in the 1926 election. He was re-elected in the 1930 federal election and was defeated in 1935 and 1940. In 1926, he was a Minister without Portfolio, Minister presiding over the Department of Health (Acting), and Minister of Soldiers' Civil Re-establishment (Acting) in the short lived cabinet of Arthur Meighen. In 1935, he was the Deputy Speaker and Chairman of Committees of the Whole of the House of Commons.

References
 

1887 births
1952 deaths
Conservative Party of Canada (1867–1942) MPs
Members of the House of Commons of Canada from Ontario
Members of the King's Privy Council for Canada
Politicians from Windsor, Ontario